Werner Brix was born on 7 December 1964 in Vienna, Austria. He is an Austrian cabaret artist, actor, and director best known for appearances in the TV series Tatort (since 2006) and Anatomy of Evil (2010) and the movie Kaliber Bloody Weekend (2000).

Life
Werner Brix was for six years a communications engineer in the information technology industry. In 1993 in Vienna he began his acting career and "has been a fixed part of the Austrian film, theater and cabaret scene ever since."  With a knack for humor, he strives to advance the values of tolerance, equality and solidarity. He appeals to a demanding audience and to the media with his motto being "humor with a brain". He is frequently invited to talk shows or to give keynote speeches in the business world. Since 2011 Brix has run his own production company, producing material for TV, commercials, and internet. 

Since 2008 he is the initiator and organizer of the annual benefit evening in favor of development aid clubs and Chairman of the Otto Tausig fund "Artists Development Aid", along with Lilly Tausig, Paul Gulda and Erwin Steinhauer.

In 2011 he was a co-founder of Facebook group Amici delle SVA, which in 2017 in association with ARGE1 established a legal entity for micro-enterprises.

Cabaret
1995: Lurch, solo cabaret
1998: Stick in iron, solo cabaret
1998: Vitasek, Puntigam and Brix
2000: Brix meets Jesus u. a., Solo cabaret
2001-2002: The Long Night of Cabaret with Leo Lukas, Ludwig Müller, Olivier Lendl, I Stangl, *Mike Supancic, Doris Kofler and Severin Groebner
2001: Solo best of BrixMix
2003: At full throttle for burnout, or Brix alone in Megaplexx, solo cabaret 
2005: fuckin 'austrian lesetheater – We read everything, with Gregor Seberg
2006: Under duress, solo cabaret
2007: The readers come, with Gregor Seberg
2009: The eroticism of power, also known as Megaplexx 2 – The best positions, solo cabaret
2011: 40plus – About Men in the Best Years, Solo Cabaret
2014: LUST – Let's live!, Solo cabaret
2016: Zuckerl, solo cabaret

Actor

Theater 
Among others: "The Incorrigible", "Treasure Island", "Dracula", "Robin Hat", "Toni & Tina's Wedding", "Loyalty or The Wedding Day", "Almost Vicious", "Just a Day", "Children of Vienna".

Film roles 
1997: Heroes in Tyrol , directed by Niki List
1997: The Polifinario, Book + Director: Peter Evers, Viennale: Nomination Price New Cinema 1998
2004: Silentium (with inter alia Josef Hader ) (Director: Wolfgang Murnberger )
2006: Jump!: (with Patrick Swayze ) Pius Believer, book + director: Joshua Sinclair
2011: The last guest: Peter, leading role, two-person short film with Simon Schwarz
2013: The Werkstürmer, Director: Andreas Schmied, Novotny
2014: Landkrimi – The Woman with a Shoe, Director: Michael Glawogger, Lotus Film

TV

1996: Commissioner Rex – Death Race
1997: Stockinger – Silent Water
1998: The Beloved and the Priest
1999: The Century Revue , directed by Harald Sicheritz
2000: Schloss Orth – Herzflimmern
2002: Trautmann – Who is sensitive, remains
2004: Trautmann – Everything the same
2005: Four women and one death – wear off warm
2006: Crime Scene – Deadly Trust
2010: Slicer (2 pieces)
2010: The winegrower king – The candidate
2011-2013: Schlawiner (4 episodes)
2012: SOKO Danube – Late area
2013: Hyundai Cabaret Days
2014: SOKO Kitzbühel – Lazy eggs
2015: Tatort – code name Kidon
2015: Small big voice
2018: Traces of Evil – Rage

Awards 
2002: Stuttgart broom
2003: Award for the KARL (Cabaret Award)
2003: Executioner's ax
2005: Salzburg Bull
2017: Reinheim satirical lion, jury prize
2018: Dresden Satire Prize

See also 
 YouTube productions
 Vimeo productions

References

1964 births
Living people
Austrian male actors
Austrian cabaret performers